The following radio stations broadcast on AM frequency 1656 kHz:

In Australia 
 VAC Chinese Radio in Brisbane, Queensland.
 Radio Rhythm in Melbourne, Victoria.
 2ME Radio Arabic in Perth, Western Australia

References

Lists of radio stations by frequency